Edwin C. Oram (October 5, 1914 – December 18, 2004) was an American basketball player.  He was an All-American college player at the University of Southern California and an early professional in the National Basketball League (NBL).  In 42 NBL contests, Oram averaged 3.8 points per game.

References

1914 births
2004 deaths
All-American college men's basketball players
American men's basketball players
Chicago Bruins players
Forwards (basketball)
Guards (basketball)
Syracuse Nationals players
USC Trojans men's basketball players